Twist of Fate, also known as Beautiful Stranger, is a 1954 British and American mystery film noir directed by David Miller and starring Ginger Rogers and Herbert Lom.

Plot
Joan Victor, an actress known as "Johnny" to her friends, is living in Cannes, France, where she and financier Louis Galt plan to marry as soon as he gets a divorce.

Marie Galt and her brothers run Louis's firm and have become suspicious of his business methods. Marie is unaware that Louis is the ringleader of a gang that deals in counterfeit gold coins.

In a casino Johnny runs into Emile Landosh, an acquaintance. He claims a need for money due to his wife's medical bills, so Johnny offers him a loan. Emile, however, is a criminal and in debt to Louis.

After overhearing Marie and realising Louis might be lying about the divorce, Johnny confronts him, then angrily leaves and drives her car off the road, leaving it damaged. She seeks help at the home of Pierre Clement, an artist. The two begin seeing each other, with Pierre teaching her how to use a pottery wheel.

Luigi, a thug who works for Louis, is pressuring Emile to repay what he owes. In desperation, Emile breaks into Johnny's villa and steals a bracelet. When he gives it to Luigi as settlement of his debt, it arouses suspicions from Louis that his lover and Emile must be having an affair, because he'd given it to Johnny as a gift.

Pierre proposes marriage to Johnny and she accepts. Emile overhears an argument between Johnny and Louis and eventually realises that she believes Louis has found out about Pierre, whereas he suspects Emile.

Emile is caught trying to crack a safe. During a struggle with him, Louis is shot with his own gun. Johnny and Pierre arrive just as Emile is trying to hide the body. They tie up Emile and are driving him to the police when they are intercepted by Luigi. A policeman shoots Luigi, but he is still able to kill Emile.

Cast
 Ginger Rogers as 'Johnny' Victor
 Herbert Lom as Emile Landosh
 Stanley Baker as Louis Galt
 Jacques Bergerac as Pierre Clement
 Margaret Rawlings as Marie Galt
 Eddie Byrne as Luigi
 Coral Browne as Helen
 Lisa Gastoni as Yvette
 Lily Kann as Nicole
 Ferdy Mayne as Police Chief
 Keith Pyott as Georges

Production
The film was known during production as Lifeline. Walter Rilla was originally cast as the male lead but he and Rogers did not get along. Said Rilla at the time,  "According to the script I – a man of 52 – am supposed to have an affair with a girl of 24, who is Miss Rogers. Which is somewhat ridiculous. She may feel 24, but really . . .

Rumours were rife about Rogers' temperament and Rilla's dissatisfaction with the size of his role in comparison to Jacques Bergerac, who was Rogers' husband at the time. Ten days into production Rilla left the film and was replaced by Stanley Baker.

Bergerac and Rogers met in France, and she was responsible for his casting.

Exteriors of the film were shot in Cannes.

Reception
TV Guide rated the film 2/4 stars and wrote that Rogers was too old to play the lead character.

The film did poorly at the box office.

References

External links
 
 
 

1954 films
1950s mystery films
American mystery films
British mystery films
1950s English-language films
Film noir
Films set in France
Films directed by David Miller
Films scored by Malcolm Arnold
British black-and-white films
American black-and-white films
1950s American films
1950s British films